Hygrophoropsis bicolor is a species of fungus in the family Hygrophoropsidaceae. Found in Japan, it was described as new to science in 1963 by Tsuguo Hongo.

References

External links

Hygrophoropsidaceae
Fungi described in 1963
Fungi of Japan